Con O’Neill (born Robert O’Neill on 15 August 1966) is an English actor. He started his acting career at the Everyman Theatre and became primarily known for his performances in musicals. He received critical acclaim and won a Laurence Olivier Award for playing Michael "Mickey" Johnstone in the musical Blood Brothers. Subsequently, he was nominated for a Tony Award and a Drama Desk Award for the same role. He has also appeared in many films and television series.

Early life
O'Neill was born on 15 August 1966 in Weston-super-Mare, Somerset.

Career
O'Neill trained at the Elliott-Clarke College in Liverpool and began his acting career at Liverpool's Everyman Youth Theatre.

He was awarded the Laurence Olivier Award for Best Actor in a Musical in 1988 for his performance in Willy Russell's Blood Brothers, and was nominated for Broadway's 1993 Tony Award for Best Actor in a Musical for Blood Brothers.

In the 1980s, he had a walk-on role in One Summer as Jackson. He starred in Dancin' Thru the Dark, the 1990 film adaptation of Willy Russell's Stags and Hens. In 1992, he played Cougar Glass in the world premiere of Philip Ridley's The Fastest Clock in the Universe. He appeared in Moving Story (1994), a TV comedy drama, as Nick, part of a removals team. He appeared as wheelchair user P.C. Ian LeFebre in "The Mild Bunch", the second season's eighth episode of Pie in the Sky (1995). He had a supporting role in Cider with Rosie (1998). In 2003, he portrayed Mickey in The Illustrated Mum. In 2006, he starred as Aston in a tour of Sheffield theatres' production of Harold Pinter's The Caretaker. In 1999, he starred in The Last Seduction II.

In 2008, he appeared in Criminal Justice a five-part TV drama on the BBC, playing the part of Ralph Stone, a solicitor. He played the part of Joe Meek in both the 2008 film and 2005 play of Telstar: The Joe Meek Story. In 2011, he took the role of dock worker Eddie Carbone in Arthur Miller's A View From the Bridge at the Royal Exchange Theatre in Manchester (from 18 May to 25 June 2011). This portrayal won the 2011 Manchester Theatre Award for Best Actor. In 2012, he played Dr. Bob Massey in "Fearful Symmetry", S6:E3 of Lewis.

He played St. Paul in the 2013 mini-series The Bible. The same year he also appeared in Life of Crime as DCI Ferguson and in Midsomer Murders "Schooled in Murder" as Jim Caxton. He portrays Val Pearson in the sitcom Uncle (2014 to 2017). He played Cliff in Cucumber, an eight-part TV drama series. In 2015, he starred in the 35th-anniversary staging of Willy Russell's Educating Rita at The Liverpool Playhouse. He appears as Neil Ackroyd in the second and third series of Happy Valley. In 2016, O'Neill played the part of Joe Brierley in the second series of Ordinary Lies and appeared in two episodes of the Doctor Who spin-off Class. In the 2019 HBO miniseries Chernobyl he portrayed the plant director Viktor Bryukhanov.
In 2022, he appeared in the HBO series Our Flag Means Death as the pirate Israel Hands (Izzy).

Filmography

Film

Television

Video games

References

External links
 
 
 
 
 
 
 

1966 births
Living people
20th-century English male actors
21st-century English male actors
20th-century English singers
21st-century English singers
English male film actors
English male stage actors
English male television actors
English male voice actors
English male singers
English people of Irish descent
Laurence Olivier Award winners
Male actors from Somerset
People from Weston-super-Mare